I Told You So is a 1976 album recorded at RCA studios, New York City on January 12, 13 and 14 1976 and released in 1976, featuring Count Basie and his orchestra. All the titles were arranged by Bill Holman. Sound engineer was Bob Simpson and the tape editor was Ben Jordan. The producer was Norman Granz.

The disc was issued on the Pablo Records label and marketed by Polydor.

Track listing 
"Tree Frog" – 5:15
"Flirt" – 5:52
"Blues for Alfy" – 4:42
"Something to Live For" (Duke Ellington, Billy Strayhorn) – 3:41
"Plain Brown Wrapper" – 4:22
"Swee'Pea" – 4:36
"Ticker" – 4:37
"Too Close for Comfort" (Jerry Bock, George David Weiss, Larry Holofcener) – 4:10
"Told You So" – 6:28
"The Git" – 3:54

All music composed by Bill Holman unless otherwise noted.

Personnel 
The Count Basie Orchestra
 Count Basie - piano
 Sonny Cohn - trumpet
 Pete Minger - trumpet
 Bobby Mitchell - trumpet
 John Thomas - trumpet
 Jack Feierman - trumpet
 Al Grey - trombone
 Curtis Fuller - trombone
 Bill Hughes - trombone
 Mel Wanzo - trombone
 Bobby Plater - alto saxophone
 Danny Turner - alto saxophone
 Jimmy Forrest - tenor saxophone
 Eric Dixon - tenor saxophone
 Charlie Fowlkes - baritone saxophone
 John Duke - double bass
 Freddie Green - guitar
 Butch Miles - drums

References

1976 albums
Count Basie Orchestra albums
Pablo Records albums
Albums produced by Norman Granz